Hess v. Pawloski, 274 U.S. 352 (1927), was a case in which the Supreme Court of the United States held that a statute designating the Massachusetts registrar of motor vehicles as agent for purpose of service of process for out-of-state non-resident motorists complies with the Due Process Clause of the Fourteenth Amendment.

Background

Hess, a Pennsylvania resident, was involved in a car accident with Pawloski, a Massachusetts resident, while driving in Worcester, Massachusetts.

At the time of the accident, a Massachusetts statute stated that a non-resident motorist implicitly consented to the appointment of the registrar of motor vehicles to act as his agent for service of process in the Commonwealth of Massachusetts, and that personal service served upon the registrar was to be as valid as personal service upon the defendant, so long as a copy of the process was forwarded by registered mail to the defendant at the defendant's last known address. This legal concept of "implied consent" allowed Massachusetts to exercise jurisdiction over nonresidents who were not present in the state at the time service of process was executed upon the agent as stipulated in the statute. In the Massachusetts court, Hess appeared specially to contest jurisdiction but not answer the claim against him. His motion to dismiss was denied.

On appeal, Hess argued that the Massachusetts statute at issue in the case was an unconstitutional exercise of the Commonwealth of Massachusetts's police power in light of the Due Process Clause of the Fourteenth Amendment, and that Massachusetts could not exercise personal jurisdiction over him because
he was not a resident of the state,
he was not personally served while in Massachusetts, and
he never consented to the appointment of an agent for service of process.

Analysis

In this decision, the Court expanded the reach of personal jurisdiction beyond rule promulgated in prior Supreme Court jurisprudence, because it suggested that non-residents are subject to a court having jurisdiction at the location of an accident. Only three exceptions to territorial jurisdiction existed: cases involving marriage status; where a party has given consent (e.g. establishing a corporation); and where the party is a resident of the state. In Hess, the court relaxed the legal rules defining consent established in Pennoyer v. Neff to include nonresidents who travel through Massachusetts using the highway system.

This decision reflected an attempt by the Court to fit the problems of an increasingly more mobile and technologically advanced society in the model of Justice Field in Pennoyer.

The Court reasoned that cars are dangerous, and that states have the power to regulate their operation in order to make highways safe. Here, the implied consent was narrowly limited to proceedings related to accidents on highways in which the non-resident is involved. The difference between a formal and informal appointment of an agent isn't substantive in relation to the Due Process Clause.

Most importantly, the statute is not hostile to the non-resident, because he is put on nearly equal footing with the resident plaintiff.

See also
List of United States Supreme Court cases, volume 274

References

External links
 
 
 Summary of Hess v. Pawloski at Lawnix.com

1927 in United States case law
United States civil procedure case law
United States Supreme Court cases
United States Supreme Court cases of the Taft Court
Transportation in Worcester, Massachusetts
Vehicle law